Saint Eigrad or Eugrad was a sixth-century Welsh saint and the founder of St Eugrad's Church in Llaneugrad, Anglesey.

Life
Eigrad is mentioned in Caradoc's Life of Gildas (12th century). He was a son of king Caw of Strathclyde, a brother of saints Gildas, and Samson of York and was a student of Saint Illtud.

In 605 AD he founded a church at Llaneugrad, Anglesey and his brother Gallgo, founded a church at Llanallgo, nearby. Today the two churches are in the same parish.

Memorial
His feast day is 6 January.

References

Welsh Roman Catholic saints
6th-century Christian saints
6th-century births
Year of birth unknown
Year of death unknown
6th-century Welsh people